Best of Both Worlds may refer to:

Albums 
 Best of Both Worlds (Davina album), 1998
 Best of Both Worlds (Midnight Oil album), 2004
 The Best of Both Worlds (Jay-Z and R. Kelly album), 2002, or the title song
 The Best of Both Worlds (Marillion album), 1997
 The Best of Both Worlds (Van Halen album), 2004

Songs 
 "Best of Both Worlds" (Robert Palmer song), 1978
 "Best of Both Worlds" (Van Halen song), 1986
 "The Best of Both Worlds" (song), theme song to the 2006 television series Hannah Montana
 "Best of Both Worlds", a song written by Don Black and Mark London, initially recorded in 1968 by Lulu and Scott Walker
 "Best of Both Worlds", a song from the Midnight Oil album Red Sails in the Sunset

Tours 
 Best of Both Worlds Tour (Jay-Z and R. Kelly), 2004 R. Kelly & Jay-Z tour
 Best of Both Worlds Tour (Miley Cyrus), the 2007–2008 concert tour headlining Miley Cyrus and her alter-ego Hannah Montana

Other 
 Hannah Montana and Miley Cyrus: Best of Both Worlds Concert, a 2008 American concert film
 "The Best of Both Worlds" (Star Trek: The Next Generation), a 1990 two-part episode of Star Trek: The Next Generation
 The Best of Both Worlds (musical), a 2005 musical 
 "The Best of Both Worlds" (Saturday Night Live), a recurring SNL sketch featuring Andy Samberg